Hyporthodus nigritus, the Warsaw grouper,  is a species of marine ray-finned fish, a grouper from the subfamily Epinephelinae which is part of the family Serranidae, which also includes the anthias and sea basses. It is found in the Western Atlantic from Massachusetts to the Gulf of Mexico, Cuba, Trinidad, and south to Brazil (Rio de Janeiro). Its natural habitats are open seas, shallow seas, subtidal aquatic beds, and coral reefs.  It is threatened by habitat loss.

The Warsaw grouper is a US National Marine Fisheries Service species of concern. Species of concern are those species about which the National Oceanic and Atmospheric Administration and National Marine Fisheries Service have some concerns regarding status and threats, but for which insufficient information is available to indicate a need to list the species under the Endangered Species Act.

Description
Hyporthodus nigritus is classified as a deep-water grouper, since they inhabit reefs on the continental shelf break in waters 180 to 1700 ft (55 to 525 m) deep; juveniles are occasionally seen on jetties and shallow-water reefs. They are the only grouper with 10 dorsal spines. They are dark reddish-brown or brownish-grey to almost black in color dorsally, and dull reddish-grey ventrally. They can very well exceed 8 ft in length. A  specimen was aged at over 50 years by biologists with Florida's Fish and Wildlife Research Institute. The specimen was caught on December 29, 2019.

Conservation
Hyporthodus nigritus is threatened by fishing or by catch release mortality (due to pressure change). Fishing is primarily by hook and line and bottom longlines, though the species is caught incidentally in the deepwater snapper/grouper commercial fishery. Almost all of the catch is in the Gulf of Mexico. The IUCN rates it Near Threatened and the American Fisheries Society lists it as Endangered.

References

nigritus
Fish of the Eastern United States
Fish of the Western Atlantic
Warsaw grouper
Taxonomy articles created by Polbot